The following is a list of the 507 communes of the Vosges department of France.

Intercommunalities 

The communes cooperate in the following intercommunalities (as of 2022):
Communauté d'agglomération d'Épinal
Communauté d'agglomération de Saint-Dié-des-Vosges (partly)
Communauté de communes des Ballons des Hautes-Vosges
Communauté de communes Bruyères - Vallons des Vosges
Communauté de communes Gérardmer Hautes Vosges
Communauté de communes des Hautes Vosges
Communauté de communes de Mirecourt Dompaire
Communauté de communes de l'Ouest Vosgien (partly)
Communauté de communes du Pays de Colombey et du Sud Toulois (partly)
Communauté de communes de la Porte des Vosges Méridionales
Communauté de communes de la Région de Rambervillers
Communauté de communes Terre d'eau
Communauté de communes des Vosges côté Sud-Ouest

List of communes

References

Vosges